The , or simply Setouchi, is a geographic region of Japan. Setouchi includes the Seto Inland Sea and the adjacent coastal areas of Honshū, Shikoku, and Kyūshū, three of the four main islands of Japan.

Yamaguchi, Hiroshima, Okayama, Hyōgo, Osaka, Kagawa, Ehime, Fukuoka, and Ōita prefectures all have coastlines in Setouchi; the cities of Hiroshima, Iwakuni, Takamatsu, and Matsuyama are also located within the region.

History 
Since the 1980s, the sea's northern and southern shores have been connected by the three routes of the Honshū–Shikoku Bridge Project, including the Great Seto Bridge, which serves both railroad and automobile traffic.

Geography 
The Setouchi region is known for its moderate climate, with a stable year-round temperature and relatively low rainfall levels. The sea is also famous for its periodic  caused by dense aggregations of certain phytoplankton that result in the deaths of large numbers of fish.

See also 
 Seto Inland Sea
 Great Seto Bridge
 Setouchi, Okayama
 Nishiseto Expressway
STU48

References

External links 
 Setouchi - English Travel - Setouchi Trip
 Setouchi - JNTO
 Setouchi Art Festival
 Setouchi Art Festival - Japan Guide

Regions of Japan
Landforms of Ehime Prefecture
Landforms of Yamaguchi Prefecture
Landforms of Hiroshima Prefecture
Landforms of Okayama Prefecture
Landforms of Hyōgo Prefecture
Landforms of Fukuoka Prefecture
Landforms of Ōita Prefecture
Landforms of Kagawa Prefecture